Dodo Ikire is a traditional delicacy from Ikire in Osun State, Nigeria. It was originally made from leftover plantain but today, people prepare it from fresh ingredients which are: over-ripe plantains, pepper, oil and salt. Dodo Ikire is black and round or conical in shape.

Plantain or cooking banana, which has been peeled, sliced and deep fried is called Dodo in some parts of Nigeria.

Legend has it that Dodo Ikire was created as an experiment by a poor, old lady from a town called Ikire. Ikire is a town in the South-western area of Nigeria between the cities of Ibadan and Ile-Ife, in Osun State. This old lady had no food left except the over-ripe plantains, which she would have normally throw in the bin, but she decided to mash it all up with some salt and pepper and deep-fry it in palm oil. She ate it, enjoyed it and decided to make more and share with her neighbours.

The result is what is now known as Dodo Ikire, named after the town it originated from. It is sold mostly in the South-western part of Nigeria.

References

External links
Dodo Ikire on food.com
Dodo Ikire on K's Cusine

Nigerian cuisine
Yoruba cuisine